Karl Genrikhovich Vaino (alias Kirill Voinov; 28 May 1923 – 12 February 2022) was a Russian-born Soviet politician in Soviet-occupied Estonia. In 1978–1988 he was the formal leader of the Communist Party of the Estonian SSR.

Early life and career
Karl Genrikhovich Vaino was born in 1923 and raised in the city of Tomsk, Siberia, in then Soviet Russia. His father Genrikh (or Heinrich Vaino; 1889–1965) was an active Bolshevik and mother Lydia née Savi was a daughter of Estonian immigrants who had settled in Siberia at the beginning of the 20th century. Genrikh had briefly moved to Estonia in 1918, but returned to Siberia after the Bolshevik Russian invasion into Estonia had failed in the 1918–1920 Estonian War of Independence.

After graduating from what is now the Omsk State Transport University in 1947, Vaino moved to then Soviet-occupied Estonia, and started working in engineering and technical jobs on the railway. He joined the Communist Party of the Soviet Union (CPSU) in 1947. He served as Secretary of the Communist Party's Tallinn Regional Committee from 1948–1953. In the 1960s and 1970s, he also served as Secretary of the Central Committee of the Communist Party of the Estonian SSR. He graduated from the Correspondence Higher Party School in 1957.

Leader of the Estonian SSR
Having lived his early life in Russia, Vaino was a native speaker of Russian language. He was not able to speak Estonian very well, and did so with a thick Russian accent. For this, he was considered to be perfect for the role of First Secretary, being a so-called "Yestonian". On 26 July 1978, the incumbent First Secretary of the past 28 years, Johannes Käbin, who was considered to be too moderate for the ongoing Era of Stagnation Russification, was forced to resign from his post and was replaced by Vaino.

As the First secretary, Vaino acquired a reputation of being an extreme Russificator. With a dismissive attitude towards Estonian language and culture, he was not popular amongst Estonians. He delivered public speeches mostly in Russian, one notable exception being at the 350th anniversary of Tartu State University, where he presented awards to university workers, speaking in Estonian with a thick Russian accent. In 1979, an unsuccessful attempt was made on his life.

Downfall
In early 1988, the CPE split into national communists and internationalists. Vaino was the leader of the latter, while the former was led by then-Soviet ambassador to Nicaragua Vaino Väljas. Being considered too conservative by the Moscow elite, after almost 10 years, Vaino was forced to resign from his post on 16 June 1988, and replaced by Väljas. Vaino would then move to Moscow, where he had lived ever since. He did not visit Estonia again.

Personal life and death 
His daughter Eleonora Kochetova is the daughter in law of Soviet writer Vsevolod Kochetov, and his son Eduard is the Vice President for External Relations at AvtoVAZ. He has two grandsons, Russian politician Anton Vaino and Russian Interior Ministry official Andrey Vaino.

On 19 February 2022, it was announced that Vaino had died at some point earlier in the year, at the age of 98. He was buried on 14 February in the Federal Military Memorial Cemetery.

Awards 
2 Orders of Lenin (1981 and 1983)
Order of the October Revolution (1971)
3 Orders of the Red Banner of Labour (1959, 1965, and 1973)
Medal "For Labour Valour" (1950)

References

1923 births
2022 deaths
People from Tomsk
Russian emigrants to Estonia
Soviet emigrants to Estonia
People from Tomsk Governorate
Heads of the Communist Party of Estonia
Central Committee of the Communist Party of the Soviet Union members
Members of the Supreme Soviet of the Estonian Soviet Socialist Republic, 1959–1963
Members of the Supreme Soviet of the Estonian Soviet Socialist Republic, 1963–1967
Members of the Supreme Soviet of the Estonian Soviet Socialist Republic, 1967–1971
Members of the Supreme Soviet of the Estonian Soviet Socialist Republic, 1971–1975
Members of the Supreme Soviet of the Estonian Soviet Socialist Republic, 1975–1980
Members of the Supreme Soviet of the Estonian Soviet Socialist Republic, 1980–1985
Members of the Supreme Soviet of the Estonian Soviet Socialist Republic, 1985–1990
Tenth convocation members of the Soviet of the Union
Eleventh convocation members of the Soviet of the Union
Recipients of the Order of Lenin
Recipients of the Order of the Red Banner of Labour
Burials at the Federal Military Memorial Cemetery